Qaleh Emam (also Romanized as Qal‘eh Emām) is a village in Gavkhuni Rural District, Bon Rud District, Isfahan County, Isfahan Province, Iran. At the 2006 census, its population was 164, in 46 families.

References 

Populated places in Isfahan County